Cynthia is a rural town and locality in the North Burnett Region, Queensland, Australia.

Geography 
The Burnett Highway passes through the locality from the south to the north-east. Its intersection with the Waruma Dam Road is the official location of the town but there is no settlement there today. The now-closed Monto Branch Railway passed from north to south through the locality passing through the former town, which was served by the now-abandoned Cynthia railway station.

The Burnett River bounds the locality to the east.

History 
The town and locality take their name from the railway station name given by Queensland Railways Department on 19 June 1925, using the name of the surrounding Cynthia Parish of the County of Yarrol.

Cynthia State School opened on 30 January 1928. It closed in 1954.

Education 
There are no schools in Cynthia. The nearest primary school is Abercorn State School in neighbouring Abercorn to the north. The nearest secondary school is Eidsvold State School in Eidsvold to the south.

References 

Towns in Queensland
North Burnett Region
Localities in Queensland